For customers of some telephone companies in Canada and in the U.S., 6-1-1 is the abbreviated dialing telephone number used to report a problem with telephone service, or with a payphone. It is an N11 code of the North American Numbering Plan that are used for special services.

Current usage

Many landline and mobile phone providers support 6-1-1. Some providers who supply other services, such as Internet or cable television, support these other services with 6-1-1. While 611 has not been officially designated by the FCC, this code receives nearly 74 million calls annually, making it the most frequently used N-1-1 number in the United States.

Assignment
The 6-1-1 number is not officially assigned by the United States Federal Communications Commission (FCC) or the Canadian Radio-television and Telecommunications Commission (CRTC), but both have chosen not to disturb the assignment as it is generally recognized across the North American Numbering Plan Administration (NANPA).

References

See also

Three-digit telephone numbers